László Szabó (born January 1, 1946, in Csókakő) is a former Hungarian handball player who competed in the 1972 Summer Olympics.

In 1972 he was part of the Hungarian team which finished eighth in the Olympic tournament. He played two matches.

References

1946 births
Living people
Hungarian male handball players
Olympic handball players of Hungary
Handball players at the 1972 Summer Olympics